Obsello Absinthe Verte, or simply Obsello was a brand of absinthe. Obsello was an award-winning "Verte" or green absinthe that was manufactured by distillation from eight herbs including grand wormwood. Obsello was distilled in California.

Production process
Obsello was a distilled verte, meaning that it was distilled from whole herbs steeped in alcohol, and colored using chlorophyl extracted from the herbs in a secondary maceration. According to the company's website (now taken down), it was a natural product made in a historical manner. The ingredients included wormwood, Alicante anise, fennel, and five other herbs, spices, roots, and flowers.

The product contained less than 10 mg per kg of thujone in its final bottled state of 50% alcohol. It was therefore legal for sale in the EU and the USA.

Coloring
Like many spirits verte absinthe improves materially with age and micro-oxidization. This is attributed in part to the slow breakdown of the chlorophyl suspended in the bottle.

Obsello was a natural verte absinthe and was thus colored with chlorophyl extracted from herbs in a secondary maceration process. This not only gave the drink its color but also imparted additional flavor of the drink.  To prevent sunlight damage, Obsello was bottled in a UV-resistant bottle and had to be kept away from prolonged exposure to sunlight.

Distribution

Obsello Absinthe is no longer available via its main retail customers but old stocks may still be found in some US States.

References 
 

Absinthes